Anticrates is a genus of moths of the Lacturidae family.

Selected species
Anticrates crocophaea Meyrick, 1921
Anticrates electropis Meyrick, 1921
Anticrates metreta (Turner, 1903)
Anticrates paraxantha (Meyrick, 1907)
Anticrates phaedima Turner, 1913
Anticrates zapyra Meyrick, 1907

References

Zygaenoidea
Zygaenoidea genera